"Love Will Find a Way" is a song by the progressive rock band Yes, from their 1987 album Big Generator. It was released as the first single from that album, reaching number 30 on the Billboard Hot 100 chart in late 1987. It also topped the U.S. Mainstream Rock chart, holding onto the number one spot for three weeks.

History 
Yes guitarist and singer Trevor Rabin originally wrote the song for singer Stevie Nicks to perform; however, Yes drummer Alan White encouraged Rabin to let Yes record the song instead.

"Love Will Find a Way" was the fifth of six Yes singles to crack the U.S. Top 40; it has been featured on several of Yes' later compilations, including the box sets Yesyears and In a Word: Yes (1969–). A video for the song is also included on Yes' Greatest Video Hits.

Personnel 
Yes
 Trevor Rabin – Lead vocals, guitars, keyboards, string arrangements, backing vocals
 Jon Anderson – Backing vocals, post-chorus lead vocals
 Tony Kaye – Hammond organ, piano
 Chris Squire – Bass guitar, backing vocals
 Alan White – Drums, percussion, backing vocals
Additional musicians
 Jimmy Zavala – harmonica
 Kim Bullard – programming

Live performances 
The song was played at every concert during the 1987-88 tour supporting Big Generator.  During the first half of the tour it was played as the first encore, and during the second half of the tour it was played early in the set list after "Shoot High Aim Low" was dropped.  After this tour the song would not be played again live until the summer 1994 tour for Talk, where it was on the set list for approximately 8 shows.  The song has not been played since.

Alternative versions 
In 2003, Trevor Rabin released a pair of albums, each of which featured a different version of "Love Will Find a Way": Live in LA features a 1989 live performance of the song, and 90124 features an early demo of the song in which Rabin sings all the vocals and plays all of the instruments.

Official remixes 
UK 12" ATCO Records – A 9449(T)
 1) "Love Will Find A Way" (Extended Version)
 2) "Love Will Find A Way" (The Rise And Fall Mix)
 3) "Holy Lamb (Song For Harmonic Convergence)"
Track 1 remixed by Freddy Bastone.
Track 2 remixed by Chris (Jelly Fish) Squire.

References

Yes (band) songs
Songs written by Trevor Rabin
Song recordings produced by Trevor Horn
1987 singles
Atco Records singles